This article lists the winners and nominees for the NAACP Image Award for Outstanding Literary Work, Instructional. The award has been given out since 2007 and since its conception, T.D. Jakes and Daymond John hold the record for most wins in this category with two each.

Winners and nominees
Winners are listed first and highlighted in bold.

2000s

2010s

2020s

Multiple wins and nominations

Wins
 2 wins
 T.D. Jakes
 Daymond John

Nominations

 3 nominations
 T.D. Jakes

 2 nominations
 Daymond John
 Tavis Smiley
 Bryant Terry

References

NAACP Image Awards
American literary awards